Archibald Knox is the name of:
Archibald Knox (designer) (1864–1933), Manx Arts & Crafts designer
Archie Knox (born 1947), Scottish football manager